Mu Canis Majoris (μ Canis Majoris) is a binary star system in the southern constellation of Canis Major. The pair can be located a little to the southwest of the point midway between Gamma and Theta Canis Majoris, and the components can be split with a small telescope. The system is faintly visible to the naked eye with an apparent visual magnitude of 5.12. Based upon an annual parallax shift of just 2.62 mas as seen from Earth, this system is located roughly 1,200 light years from the Sun.

Grotius assigned the name Isis to this star, but the name, now obsolete, belonged rather to Gamma Canis Majoris.

As of 2011, the pair had an angular separation of 2.77 arc seconds along a position angle of 343.9°. The orange-hued primary member, component A, is an evolved K-type giant star with a stellar classification of K2/3 III and a visual magnitude of 5.27. The base magnitude 7.32 companion, component B, is a hybrid B/A-type main-sequence star with a class of B9/A0 V.

The system has two visual companions. As of 2008, magnitude 10.32 component C lies at an angular separation of 86.90″, while magnitude 10.64 component D is at a separation of 105.0″. Mu CMa should not be confused with the 9th magnitude variable star MU CMa located near NGC 2360.

References

External links
 
 WikiSky, μ CMa (Isis)
 Alcyone, μ Canis Majoris 

HR 2593 
HD 51250
HD 51251

Canis Majoris, Mu
Canis Major
BD-13 1741
Canis Majoris, 18
051250
033345
2593